Bharati Vidyapeeth University’s New Law College, established in 1978, is the premier institute of international excellence in the field of legal education. It is one of the constituent units of Bharati Vidyapeeth University Pune, recognized by Bar Council of India & University Grant Commission. The college is also recognized under 2f & 12b of UGC Act 1956. The college is Re-Accredited with “A+” Grade by NAAC .The college was inaugurated in the year 1978 at the hands of Hon. Mr. Justice Y.V. Chandrachud the then Chief Justice of India. The foundation stone of the New Law College building was laid down in the year 2004 at the hands of the Chief Justice of India Hon. Mr. Justice K.G. Balakrishnan, the then judge Supreme Court of India. The new building of the law college was inaugurated in the year 2005 at the hands of Hon. Mr. Justice R.C. Lahoti, the then Chief Justice of India. The college has celebrated its silver jubilee in the year 2003 .

Admission 

College take admission through BVP CET result, conducted by Bharati Vidyapeeth, admission form are available online in University official website.

Campus 

New law college is situated in Erandwane campus of Bharati Vidyapeeth. The College is housed in seven storied building, It has ICT equipped 40 class rooms, spacious library with reading room, cyber cell, placement cell, moot court room, legal aid cell, human rights cell, women empowerment cell, sports room, NSS room, conference hall etc.

Courses 

New law college currently provide following courses  

PhD in law, Diploma courses, LLB 3Yr, 

BALLB 5Yr Integrated, 

BBALLB 5Yr Integrated, 

LLM

References

External links
Bharati Vidyapeeth University page about New Law College, 

1978 establishments in Maharashtra
Educational institutions established in 1978
Law schools in Maharashtra
Universities and colleges in Pune